Murtiya  is a village development committee in Sarlahi District in the Janakpur Zone of south-eastern Nepal. At the time of the 1991 Nepal census it had a population of 6,485 people living in 1,120 individual households.

References

External links
UN map of the municipalities of Sarlahi  District

Populated places in Sarlahi District